The Talkeetna Mountains (Dghelaay tahwt’aene in Ahtna) are a mountain range in Alaska. The Matanuska and Susitna River valleys, with towns such as Trapper Creek, Talkeetna, Wasilla, Palmer, Sutton, and Chickaloon, roughly bound the Talkeetnas in the westerly parts of the range. Alaska Highway 4 runs northward through this lowland. Hundreds of miles to the west Alaska Highway 3 runs along the western side of the Talkeetna range, with the Alaska Range directly west. Alaska Highway 1, running along the southern front of the Talkeetna Mountains, lies mainly in a valley marking a tectonic divide between the Jurassic and Cretaceous rocks of the accretionary wedge, island-arc, and basement rocks in the Peninsular terrane (and other terranes forming the Talkeetna Mountains), and the Chugach Mountains in the Chugach terrane to the south. The range stretches as much as a hundred miles north to south. Alaska Highway 8, seasonal and unpaved, passes over highlands rising to above , north of the Talkeetnas.

Hatcher Pass, a seasonal highway pass across the southwestern corner of the range, provides views into the glaciated interior of the range, and is the location of Independence Mine State Historical Park.

The majority of the land is state-owned, and it is home to many large mammals including grizzly/brown bears, black bears, moose, caribou, wolves, wolverines, and Dall sheep.

Notable Peaks

 Sovereign Mountain (8849 ft.)
 White Knight Peak (8450 ft.)
 Tyrant's Tor (8150 ft.)
 Mount Apollo (7950 ft.)
 Mount Monarch (7108 ft.)
 Granite Peak (6729 ft.)
 Lava Mountain (6620 ft.)
 Gunsight Mountain (6441 ft.)
 Mount Watana (6255 ft.)
 Sheep Mountain (6223 ft.)

Notable Glaciers

 Chickaloon Glacier
 Talkeetna Glacier
 Mint Glacier
 Snowbird Glacier
 Bomber Glacier
 Penny Royal Glacier

Gallery

See also

 Matanuska Formation

References

Articles containing video clips
Mountain ranges of Alaska
Mountains of Matanuska-Susitna Borough, Alaska